Estonia participated at the 2019 Summer Universiade in Naples, Italy from 3 to 14 July 2019. A total of 51 athletes competed. Estonia won 1 gold and 1 bronze medal.

Medalists

References

Nations at the 2019 Summer Universiade
Summer Universiade
2019